The 2006 New Year's Revolution was the second annual New Year's Revolution professional wrestling pay-per-view (PPV) event produced by World Wrestling Entertainment (WWE). It was held exclusively for wrestlers from the promotion's Raw brand division. It took place on January 8, 2006, at the Pepsi Arena in Albany, New York.

The main event was an Elimination Chamber match for the WWE Championship involving champion John Cena, Kurt Angle, Shawn Michaels, Kane, Carlito, and Chris Masters. Cena won the match and retained the title after last eliminating Carlito. After the match, Edge cashed in his Money in the Bank contract and defeated Cena to win the WWE Championship, which was the first-ever Money in the Bank cash-in match. One of the predominant matches on the card was Triple H versus Big Show, which Triple H won by pinfall after executing a Pedigree. Another primary match on the undercard was Ric Flair versus Edge for the WWE Intercontinental Championship, which Flair won after Edge got himself intentionally disqualified.

Production

Background
In early January 2005, World Wrestling Entertainment (WWE) produced a pay-per-view (PPV) entitled New Year's Revolution, which was exclusively produced for wrestlers of the Raw brand. The name of the event itself was a play on the Western tradition of New Year's resolutions. New Year's Revolution returned the following year on January 8, 2006, at the Pepsi Arena in Albany, New York, also exclusive to Raw, thus establishing New Year's Revolution as an annual event for the promotion.

Storylines

The main feud heading into New Year's Revolution was between John Cena, Kurt Angle, Shawn Michaels, Kane, Carlito and Chris Masters over the WWE Championship. This feud started on the December 5, 2005, episode of Raw when Eric Bischoff announced an Elimination Chamber match for New Year's Revolution. On December 12, qualifying matches for the Elimination Chamber match occurred. Angle qualified after defeating Ric Flair, Carlito qualified after defeating Shelton Benjamin, Shawn Michaels qualified after defeating the Big Show by disqualification, Chris Masters qualified after defeating Viscera and finally Kane qualified after defeating Triple H with help from his partner Big Show.

The secondary feud heading into the pay-per-view was between Triple H and the Big Show. The rivalry started on the November 28 when Triple H bragged about the destruction of Ric Flair until Show came and confronted him. On the December 12 episode of Raw, Show faced Shawn Michaels in a qualifying match for the Elimination Chamber match until Triple H came down with a steel chair and hit Michaels with the intention of getting Show disqualified. Show was disqualified, so Michaels qualified and was made a part of the Elimination Chamber match. Later that same night, Triple H faced Show's World Tag Team Championship partner Kane in a qualifying match for the Elimination Chamber match. Show interrupted in the match and helped Kane beat Triple H to qualify.

The third feud heading into New Year's Revolution was between Ric Flair and Edge over the WWE Intercontinental Championship. Their rivalry started on the December 5 episode of Raw when Edge's interview segment The Cutting Edge debuted. Edge and Lita insulted Flair so much that it forced Sgt. Slaughter and Michael Hayes to shut down the segment. Edge attacked both men and left them laid into the ring.

Event

Preliminary matches 

Before the event went live on pay-per-view, Chavo Guerrero Jr. defeated Gene Snitsky in a Heat match. The opening match was Ric Flair against Edge for the Intercontinental Championship. Flair attempted to apply the figure four leglock on Edge but Lita distracted Flair, leading to Flair applying the Figure Four Leglock on Lita. Edge attacked Flair with his Money in the Bank briefcase, thus being disqualified and losing the match.

In the next match, Trish Stratus faced Mickie James for the WWE Women's Championship. James executed Stratusfaction and then attempted a Mick Kick but Stratus countered with a Chick Kick to retain the title.

The third match was between Jerry Lawler and Gregory Helms. Lawler executed a Diving Fist Drop on Helms to win the match.

In the next match, Triple H faced Big Show. Whilst the referee was down, Triple H hit Big Show with a broken sledgehammer and executed a Pedigree to win.

The fifth match was between Shelton Benjamin and Viscera. Momma Benjamin attacked Viscera with her  loaded purse twice and Benjamin performed a dragon whip for the victory.

The sixth match was the first Bra & Panties Gauntlet match. Maria Kanellis encountered Vince's Devils (Candice Michelle, Victoria, and Torrie Wilson) in the match. Maria faced Candice Michelle and stripped her and Torrie Wilson. Maria was unable to strip Victoria, who instead stripped Maria. The Fabulous Moolah and Mae Young made a surprise appearance, beginning to strip Victoria. When Moolah and Young left, Ashley Massaro quickly came to the ring and won the match after removing Victoria's pants.

Main event 

In the main event, John Cena faced Shawn Michaels, Kurt Angle, Kane, Carlito and Chris Masters in an Elimination Chamber match for the WWE Championship. Michaels and Cena began the match and Carlito and Angle were the third and fourth entrants. As Angle entered, he suplexed the other three men, catapulted Michaels into the Chamber wall and threw him into a chamber pod. Angle applied the ankle lock on Carlito until Chris Masters entered and attacked Angle. Angle applied the ankle lock on Cena but Michaels performed Sweet Chin Music on Angle to eliminate him. Kane entered the match and executed chokeslams on all the participants. Carlito and Masters formed an alliance, double-teaming Kane to eliminate him. Michaels performed a diving elbow drop and Sweet Chin Music on Cena but Carlito executed a rolling cutter and pinned Michaels to eliminate him. Masters performed a DDT on Cena onto the chamber floor. Carlito and Masters attacked Cena and Carlito ordered Masters to apply the Masterlock on Cena. Masters did so until Carlito turned on Masters, attacking him with a low blow. Carlito rolled up Masters to eliminate him and then Cena rolled up Carlito to win the match and retain the title.

After the match as Cena was attempting to recover, Vince McMahon came out, announcing that Edge was cashing in his Money in the Bank contract. Edge speared Cena for a nearfall. Edge then speared Cena a second time to win the title in the first-ever Money in the Bank cash-in match.

Aftermath
After the Elimination Chamber match, Kurt Angle moved to SmackDown! on January 13 when he participated in the 20-man battle royal for the vacant World Heavyweight Championship. Angle won the battle royal by last eliminating Mark Henry and became the new World Heavyweight Champion.

John Cena and Edge continued to feud over the WWE Championship. On the January 9 episode of Raw, Edge and Lita had a live sex celebration, which was crashed by Cena. Edge escaped from the ring while Cena and Lita were alone in the ring. Cena performed his finishing move, the FU on her to end the segment. Their rivalry led to a WWE Championship rematch at the Royal Rumble, which Cena won.

Tension between Trish Stratus and Mickie James continued to build following New Year's Revolution. After the duo defeated Candice Michelle and Victoria at Saturday Night's Main Event XXXII, James again attempted to kiss Stratus, but was rebuffed. James attacked Stratus, leading to a rematch for the WWE Women's Championship at WrestleMania 22, which James won, earning her first Women's Championship.

Results

Elimination Chamber entrances and eliminations

References

External links
Official New Year's Revolution 2006 website

2006 in New York (state)
Events in New York (state)
2006
2006 WWE pay-per-view events
January 2006 events in the United States
Events in Albany, New York
Professional wrestling in Albany, New York
Holidays themed professional wrestling events
WWE Raw